The  is a 4-laned national expressway in Nagano Prefecture, Japan. It is owned and operated by East Nippon Expressway Company and Central Nippon Expressway Company.

Naming

The expressway is officially referred to as the Chūō Expressway Nagano Route. The Chūō Expressway Nagano Route is the official designation for the Chūō Expressway between Takaido Interchange and Okaya Junction (concurrent with the Chūō Expressway Nishinomiya Route), the Nagano Expressway between Okaya Junction and Kōshoku Junction, and the Jōshin-etsu Expressway between Kōshoku Junction and Suzaka-Naganohigashi Interchange (concurrent with the Kan-Etsu Expressway Jōetsu Route).

Overview

The expressway was originally built and managed by Japan Highway Public Corporation. On October 1, 2005, the management of the route was assigned to East Nippon Expressway Company (Kōshoku Junction to Azumino Interchange, excluding the interchange) and Central Nippon Expressway Company (Okaya Junction to Azumino Interchange, including the interchange).

The route of the expressway runs through the central part of Nagano Prefecture. From the origin at a junction with the Chūō Expressway in the city of Okaya near Lake Suwa, the expressway follows a northerly course to Matsumoto, the major city in the central Nagano area. From here the expressway follows a winding northeasterly course through mountainous areas before reaching the terminus in the city of Chikuma. Beyond the terminus, the roadway continues as the Jōshin-etsu Expressway towards the city of Nagano, the prefectural capital.

History 
 March 25, 1986 - Okaya Junction - Okaya Interchange section is opened as part of the Chūō Expressway.
 March 5, 1988 - Okaya Interchange - Matsumoto Interchange section is opened, Okaya Junction - Okaya Interchange section is incorporated as part of the Nagano Expressway.
 August 3, 1988 - Matsumoto Interchange - Toyoshina Interchange section is opened.
 March 25, 1993 - Toyoshina Interchange - Kōshoku Junction section is opened, connects with Jōshin-etsu Expressway.
 October 1, 2006 - Obasute Smart Interchange is opened at Obasute Service Area.

List of interchanges and features 

 IC - interchange, SIC - smart interchange, JCT - junction, SA - service area, PA - parking area, BS - bus stop, CB - snow chains, TN - tunnel, BR - bridge

There is one snow chain changing area between Obasute Service Area and Kōshoku Interchange.

References

External links 
 East Nippon Expressway Company
Central Nippon Expressway Company

Expressways in Japan